This is a list of Old Whitgiftians (abbreviated OWs), former pupils of Whitgift School, which is a British private boys' day school in South Croydon.

Academia, medicine and science
Gordon Kauffman, architect of the Hoover Dam
Stafford Beer, cybernetics expert, businessman and author
Sir James Berry, surgeon
Peter Bourne, physician, anthropologist, biographer, author and international civil servant
Sir Robert Boyd, space research scientist
Donald Broom, biologist
Hugh Ernest Butler FRSE, astronomer
Sir Bernard Crick, academic, British political theorist, author
Prof John William Henry Eyre FRSE, bacteriologist
Walter Godfrey,  architect, antiquary, and architectural and topographical historian
Dalziel Hammick, research chemist
Bryan Harrison, virologist
Michael Hart, political scientist
Michael Hassell, biologist
Eric John Hewitt, plant physiologist
Arthur Robert Hinks, astronomer and geographer
Francis Hodgson, educator, cleric and author
Dr Andrew Holding, Biomedical Academic and Radio Presenter 
Liam Hudson, social psychologist and author
Kenneth H. Jackson, linguist and translator
Euan MacKie, archaeologist and anthropologist
Michael Posner, economist
Kawal Rhode, engineer, professor at King's College London
Dafydd Stephens, audiological physician
John Tedder, 2nd Baron Tedder, professor of chemistry
Eric Tomlin, philosopher
Sir Gilbert Walker, physicist and statistician
Roger Wickson, teacher, historian
Paul Wild, pioneering radio astronomer, chairman of CSIRO

Business
Sir Bernard Ashley, businessman, husband of Laura Ashley
Jerry Buhlmann, Chief Executive of Aegis Group
John Wingett Davies (1908–1992), cinema exhibitor and director of Davies and Newman
Andy Duncan, former Chief Executive, Channel 4
Kevin Kalkhoven, venture capitalist
Andrew Tierney, also known as Cybergibbons, a personality in the world of cyber security famous for public disagreements with John McAfee over the Bitfi product, accepting the Pwnie Award 2019 for them.

Law, government and politics
Edward Archer, Australian politician
Lord Bowness, Conservative politician
Scroop Egerton, 1st Duke of Bridgewater, British peer and courtier
Eddy Butler, far right politician
Sir Nicholas Carew, 1st Baronet, politician, MP for Haslemere
Sir Jeremy Cooke, High Court judge
Lord Diplock, judge and Law Lord
Lord Freeman, Conservative politician
Lord Freud, senior government advisor on welfare reform
Sir Daniel Harvey, merchant, politician, Ambassador to the Ottoman Empire
David Kerr, Labour politician
Sir Keith Lindblom, High Court judge
Charles Jenkinson, 3rd Earl of Liverpool, politician
Lord Percy of Alnwick, MP for Marlborough, Portsmouth and Northumberland
Lord Prentice, politician
William Style, barrister and legal author
Lord Trend, civil servant
Lord Tope, Liberal Democrat politician
Richard Vaughan, 2nd Earl of Carbery, Welsh soldier, peer and politician
Lord Wedderburn of Charlton, Labour politician, lawyer
Timothy Fancourt, Barrister and High Court judge

Media, music and the arts
Derren Brown, illusionist
Leonard Barden, chess columnist
Eric Barker, writer and comedian
Jamie Bulloch, translator
Loyle Carner, hip hop musician 
Kit Connor, actor
Tim Davie, Director-General, BBC
Basil Dean,  actor, film and theatrical producer/director
Robert Dougall, BBC newsreader and President of the Royal Society for the Protection of Birds (RSPB)
Paul England (1893–1968), actor, singer, director, author, and translator
Sir Newman Flower, publisher and author
Neil Gaiman, author
Jonathan "JB" Gill, member of the band JLS
Tim Gudgin, BBC radio presenter and voiceover artist
Martin Jarvis, actor
Gordon Kaufmann, British-American architect
Robert Keable, novelist and priest
Michael Legat, author, publisher
Conrad Leonard, composer and pianist
Peter Ling, creator of TV soap Crossroads
Anthony McCall, avant-garde artist
Tarik O'Regan, composer
Gary Taphouse, Sky Sports football commentator 
Jon Pearn, Grammy Award & Ivor Novello Award nominated record producer
Steve Punt, writer, comedian and actor
Leon Quartermaine, stage actor
Jeremy Sams, director, writer, orchestrator and lyricist
Mark Shivas, film and television producer
Alan Truscott, bridge player, columnist, author
William Waterhouse, bassoonist and musicologist
Colin Watson, author
Pete Wiggs, musician.
Harcourt Williams, actor and director
Guy Woolfenden, conductor and composer with around 150 scores for the Royal Shakespeare Company
Arthur William Groom, The prolific author of over one hundred books for children.

Military
Group Captain John "Cats Eyes" Cunningham, RAF officer and ace pilot
Air Vice-Marshal John Downey, RAF officer and fighter pilot
Bryan Draper, RAF officer and flying ace
Captain Alex Eida RHA, army officer, killed in action in Afghanistan, 1 August 2006
Captain Kenneth Lockwood, prisoner at Colditz, honorary secretary of Colditz Association
Lieutenant colonel Colin "Mad Mitch" Mitchell, Commanding Officer 1st Battalion The Argyll and Sutherland Highlanders, politician, founder of the Halo Trust
Vice Admiral Henry Palmer, officer, Comptroller of Royal Navy
Air Vice-Marshal Sir Frederick Hugh Sykes, officer, Chief of the Air Staff and Governor of Bombay
Sir Arthur Tedder, 1st Baron Tedder, Marshal of the Royal Air Force, Deputy Supreme Commander of D-Day, and Deputy Supreme Commander of Allied Forces in Europe under Dwight D. Eisenhower. Tedder was the Allied witness who signed the German Instrument of Surrender in May 1945, ending the Second World War in Europe.
General Sir Peter Wall, officer and former head of the British Army as Chief of the General Staff

Sport
Paul Archer, Newbury Rugby Club head coach
Geoffrey Bozman, cricketer, Europeans
Troy Brown, footballer, Rotherham United and Wales under-21
Rory Burns, cricketer Surrey CCC and England
Danny Cipriani, rugby union player, England Rugby and Sale Sharks
Ernest Cowdrey, cricketer, father of Colin Cowdrey
Vivian Crawford, cricketer, England, Surrey CCC and Leicestershire CCC
Elliot Daly, rugby union player, England Rugby, Barbarians, British and Irish Lions and Saracens
Laurie Evans, cricketer, Warwickshire CCC
Mark Foster, rugby union player, Exeter Chiefs
Lee Hills, footballer, Crystal Palace
Callum Hudson-Odoi, footballer, Chelsea
George Keay, cricketer
Tom Lancefield, cricketer, Surrey CCC
Tosh Masson, rugby union player, Harlequins
George Merrick, rugby union player, Clermont Auvergne
George Pilkington Mills, English racing cyclist
Victor Moses, footballer, Chelsea and Nigeria
Jamal Musiala, footballer, Bayern Munich
Lawrence Okoye, American Football Player, San Francisco 49ers, British discus record holder
Gordon Orford, cricketer, Europeans
Jason Roy, cricketer, Surrey CCC and England
Dominic Sibley, cricketer Warwickshire CCC
Jamie Smith, cricketer, Surrey CCC
Stan South, rugby union player, Exeter Chiefs
Matthew Spriegel, cricketer, Northamptonshire CCC
Robert Strang, English cricketer
Raman Subba Row, cricketer, England, Surrey and Northamptonshire
Adam Thompstone, rugby union player, Leicester Tigers
Richard Thorpe, rugby union player, Leicester Tigers
Bertrand Traoré, footballer, Aston Villa
Dudley Tredger, British Épée fencer
Freddie van den Bergh, cricketer, Surrey CCC
Harry Williams, rugby union player, Exeter Chiefs, England Rugby
Marland Yarde, rugby union player, Sale Sharks
Stephen Potts, British sabre fencer
Joseph Choong, modern pentathlete and Olympic gold medallist

Other

Colin Buchanan, priest, former Bishop of Aston and Bishop of Woolwich
Roberta Cowell, racing driver, World War 2 fighter pilot and the first known British transsexual woman to undergo sex reassignment surgery
Harold Davidson,  "The Rector of Stiffkey", killed by a lion
Martin Coles Harman, self-styled King of Lundy
Charles Howard, 3rd Earl of Nottingham, aristocrat
Michael Manktelow, priest, former Bishop of Basingstoke
James Roxburgh, priest, former Bishop of Barking
Francis Skeat, church stained glass designer
Graham Smith, priest, Dean of Norwich till 2013
Cyril Uwins, test pilot
Shaneel Mirza, fitness and finance entrepreneur

References

Whitgift